Albert Falaux (10 April 1921 – 30 May 2013) was a French wrestler. He competed in the men's Greco-Roman lightweight at the 1948 Summer Olympics.

References

External links
 

1921 births
2013 deaths
French male sport wrestlers
Olympic wrestlers of France
Wrestlers at the 1948 Summer Olympics
Sportspeople from Paris
20th-century French people